The statue of Saint Wenceslas in Prague, Czech Republic depicts Wenceslaus I, Duke of Bohemia. It is installed at Wenceslas Square.

Description
The mounted saint was sculpted by Josef Václav Myslbek in 1887–1924, and the image of Wenceslas is accompanied by other Czech patron saints carved into the ornate statue base: Saint Ludmila, Saint Agnes of Bohemia, Saint Prokop, and Saint Adalbert of Prague. The statue base, designed by architect Alois Dryák, includes the inscription: "Svatý Václave, vévodo české země, kníže náš, nedej zahynouti nám ni budoucím" (English: "Saint Wenceslas, duke of the Czech land, prince of ours, do not let perish us nor our descendants").

References

External links

 

Equestrian statues in the Czech Republic
Monuments and memorials in Prague
Outdoor sculptures in Prague
Sculptures of men in Prague
Wenceslas
Statues in Prague
Tourist attractions in Prague
Wenceslaus I, Duke of Bohemia
New Town, Prague